Palagara is a village in Balijipeta mandal of Parvathipuram Manyam district, Andhra Pradesh, India. It is the third most populous village in the Balijipeta mandal after Balijipeta and Pedapenki.

Demographics
 Indian census, the demographic details of this village is as follows:

 Total Population: 	5,730 in 1,319 Households.
 Male Population: 	2,857
 Female Population: 	2,873
 Children Under 6-years of age: 592 (Boys - 308 and Girls - 284)
 Total Literates: 	2,766

References

Villages in Parvathipuram Manyam district